In 2003, the Polish Air Force invited the Israeli Air Force to participate in an air fair in Radom to mark the 50th anniversary of the establishment of the Polish Air Force. Amir Eshel, then a Brigadier General, was an amateur historian who had investigated the question of why the Allies did not bomb Auschwitz during World War II. He implored his commander, Dan Halutz, to accept the invitation with the condition that some of the planes could fly from Radom to Auschwitz as a tribute to the victims of the Holocaust. Eshel, himself a son of Holocaust survivors, along with pilots Avi Maor and Avi Lebkowitz and weapon systems officer Shimshon Rozen, participated in the air fair with both ground and aerial displays.

The flight from Radom to Israel included the flyover of Auschwitz, nicknamed Flight 301, so the pilots did not have to change or extend their flight route. On September 4, 2003, three F-15 planes took off from the Radom airport in bad weather and flew about 200 km above a thick layer of clouds before descending to a low altitude of 1,200 feet and flying in formation over the camp. They flew over the gate, the railway, the ramp, and the array of Israeli Defense Forces soldiers, while Amir Eshel read a short paragraph he had written especially for the occasion over the intercom system. The paragraph honored the victims of the Holocaust and reaffirmed the commitment of the Israeli Air Force to protecting the Jewish people and their country, Israel:

Haaretz columenist, Ari Shavit, wrote:

References

Israeli Air Force
Auschwitz concentration camp

he:מטס חיל האוויר מעל אושוויץ